The 2009 Vancouver Whitecaps season was the club's 24th year of existence (or 34th if counting the NASL Whitecaps), as well as their 17th and 2nd last year as a Division 2 club in the franchise model of US-based soccer leagues. Vancouver was officially named an MLS expansion city on March 18, 2009. Following the end of the 2010 season, the Whitecaps FC joined MLS, becoming the second Canadian club and 19th overall (counting contracted franchises) to enter the league.

The 2009 season started in an up and down fashion including three game winning and losing streaks before ending the season with only one loss in their last ten games. The USL-1 league was a closely contested affair with the Whitecaps a member of an intermediate trifecta in the standings separated by less than three points.   The Whitecaps overcame the Railhawks and Timbers in tight, hard won playoff series before finishing as runners-up to the Montreal Impact in a dramatic playoff final series.

The Whitecaps also finished second in the 2009 Voyaguers Cup in a controversial fashion after Montreal rested important players for their following USL-1 league match against the Whitecaps.

2009 Montreal controversy 

June 18, 2009: After losing any chance to win the round robin, the Impact lose 1–6 to TFC giving the Voyageurs Cup to TFC over Vancouver on goal difference while coach Marc Dos Santos rests key players for the league match against Vancouver two days later. The Vancouver Whitecaps team attended the TFC-Impact game.
June 20, 2009: Two days later Montreal Impact win their USL-1 league game 2–1 against Vancouver. The Montreal Ultras protest against Impact management's unsportsmanlike behaviour two days earlier during the first half.
September 18, 2009: The extra three points Montreal got against Vancouver is also the difference between fifth and seventh place in the end-of-season league standings putting the Whitecaps at a lower seed in the USL season ending playoff tournament.
October 17, 2009: Montreal Impact win the league playoff final's second leg 3–1 at home with the Whitecaps playing shorthanded due to a second sending off in a row, and Montreal wins the USL-1 Championship 6–3 on aggregate.

Schedule and results

Tables 

† Austin deducted two points for fielding an ineligible player on July 25, 2009

Results summary

Pre-season

USL-1

Results by round

Post-season
Play-in Round

Semi-finals

Finals

Voyaguers Cup

Standings

Toronto FC qualified for the CONCACAF Champions League qualifying round.

Results

Cascadia Cup

Staff

Professional teams
 President – Bob Lenarduzzi
 Director of professional teams – Greg Anderson
 Manager professional teams – Lindsay Puchlik
 Manager communications – Nathan Vanstone
 Head coach men's – Teitur Thordarson
 Assistant coach, men's – Todd Wawrousek
 Head coach, women's – Alan Koch
 Assistant coach, Women's -
 Women's manager – Diane Voice
 Club logistics manager – Matt Holbrook
 Equipment manager – Darren Woloshen

Youth development
 Youth development director – Dan Lenarduzzi
 Youth development administrator – Marlise Buchi

Professional development program
 Managing director, professional development – Chris Murphy
 Managing director, residency – Thomas Niendorf 
 Administrator, residency – Allison Hogg 
 Manager, technical programs – Dave Irvine
 Developer, whitecaps interactive – Byron Ribble
 Head coach, prospects boys – Bart Choufour 
 Head coach, prospects girls – Jesse Symons

Community soccer system
 Manager, community soccer system – Sam Lenarduzzi

Current roster
Both Jay Nolly and Marcus Haber played all thirty regular season games with Jay Nolly playing every minute of every game. Charles Gbeke was tied for second among the USL-1 point leaders including the league golden boot with 12 goals while Marcus Haber was 7th (with 8 goals) and Marlon James 8th. Wes Knight had eight assists in the league.

After the 2008 season, the Whitecaps and coach Teitur Thordarson changed the roster much more than in the previous seven years. Some of this was due to a ten-month contract versus the previous norm of an eight-month contract.  Look at the preseason above starting in February with presumably a training camp before hand versus previous years of training camp starting in late March.  For some players with other part-time or off season employment and/or families the extra commitment was too much.  Many long time stalwart veteran Whitecap players such as Jeff Clarke, Jason Jordan, Steve Kindel and Alfredo Valente were not on the 2009 roster. Additionally, several other players earning significant playing time over a number of years moved elsewhere. Eduardo Sebrango and back-up goalkeeper Serge Djekanovic started the 2009 season with Canadian rival Montreal while Nicholas Addlery went all the way to Puerto Rico.

Two players who remained to serve as the backbone of the side for 2009 were Martin Nash, the captain, and striker Charles Gbeke for offense. The club added Marco Reda from Charleston, Justin Thompson from Portland, and Ansu Toure from Miami. Foreign players signings included Caribbean internationals Kenold Versailles (Haiti) and Tyrell Burgess (Bermuda), who spent 2008 with the USL PDL's Reading Rage. Another signing for the portion of the season he was with the Whitecaps was former New York Red Bulls defender Jeff Parke.

All stats as of the end of the season.

Goalkeeper stats

Player statistics

References

External links

Vancouver Whitecaps (1986–2010) seasons
Vancouver Whitecaps
2009 United Soccer Leagues
Vancouver Whitecaps